Raymond or Ray Hitchcock may refer to:

 Raymond Hitchcock (actor) (1865–1929), American stage and screen actor
 Raymond Hitchcock (author) (1922–1992), English novelist and screenwriter
 Ray Hitchcock (cricketer) (1929–2019), New Zealand cricketer 
 Ray Hitchcock (born 1965), American football player whose given name is Raeburn

See also
Hitchcock (disambiguation)